Vera Florence Cooper Rubin (July 23, 1928 – December 25, 2016) was an American astronomer who pioneered work on galaxy rotation rates. She uncovered the discrepancy between the predicted and observed angular motion of galaxies by studying galactic rotation curves. Identifying the galaxy rotation problem, her work provided the first evidence for the existence of dark matter. These results were confirmed over subsequent decades.

Beginning her academic career as the sole undergraduate in astronomy at Vassar College, Rubin went on to graduate studies at Cornell University and Georgetown University, where she observed deviations from Hubble flow in galaxies and provided evidence for the existence of galactic superclusters. She was honored throughout her career for her work, receiving the Bruce Medal, the Gold Medal of the Royal Astronomical Society, and the National Medal of Science, among others.

Rubin spent her life advocating for women in science and was known for her mentorship of aspiring female astronomers. She pioneered the field for many, and, in 2015, the National Science Foundation Vera C. Rubin Observatory (Large Synoptic Survey Telescope acronym: LSST) began construction. Her legacy was described by The New York Times as "ushering in a Copernican-scale change" in cosmological theory.

Early life 
Vera Cooper was born on July 23, 1928 in Philadelphia, Pennsylvania. She was the younger of two sisters. Her parents were Jewish immigrants from Eastern Europe: Pesach Kobchefski (Philip Cooper), born in Vilnius, Lithuania (then part of Poland), who anglicized his name, and became an electrical engineer. He worked at Bell Telephone. He married Rose Applebaum, from Bessarabia (in present-day Moldova). They met at Bell, where Rose worked until they married.

The Coopers moved to Washington, D.C. in 1938, where 10-year-old Vera developed an interest in astronomy while watching the stars from her window. "Even then I was more interested in the question than in the answer," she remembered. "I decided at an early age that we inhabit a very curious world." She built a crude telescope out of cardboard with her father, and began to observe and track meteors. She attended Coolidge Senior High School, graduating in 1944.

Cooper's older sister, Ruth Cooper Burg, became an attorney. She later worked as an administrative law judge in the United States Department of Defense.

Education 
Cooper was inspired to pursue an undergraduate education at Vassar College – then an all-women's school and she was also inspired by Maria Mitchell who had been a professor in that same college in 1865. She ignored advice she had received from a high school science teacher to avoid a scientific career and become an artist. She graduated Phi Beta Kappa and earned her bachelor's degree in astronomy in 1948, the only graduate in astronomy that year. She attempted to enroll in a graduate program at Princeton, but was barred due to her gender. Princeton would not accept women as astronomy graduate students for 27 more years. Rubin also turned down an offer from Harvard University.

She married in 1948, and her husband, Robert Joshua Rubin, was a graduate student at Cornell University.

Rubin then enrolled at Cornell University, and earned a master's degree in 1951. During her graduate studies, she studied the motions of 109 galaxies and made one of the first observations of deviations from Hubble flow (how the galaxies move apart from one another). She worked with astronomer Martha Carpenter on galactic dynamics, and studied under Philip Morrison, Hans Bethe, and Richard Feynman. Though the conclusion she came to – that there was an orbital motion of galaxies around a particular pole – was disproven, the idea that galaxies were moving held true and sparked further research. Her research also provided early evidence of the supergalactic plane. This information and the data she discovered was immensely controversial. After she struggled to be allowed to present her work at the American Astronomical Society despite being visibly pregnant, she was summarily rejected and the paper was forgotten.

Rubin studied for her Ph.D. at Georgetown University, the only university in Washington, D.C. that offered a graduate degree in astronomy.

She was 23 years old and pregnant when she began her doctoral studies, and the Rubins had one young child at home. She began to take classes with Francis Heyden, who recommended her to George Gamow of the neighboring George Washington University, her eventual doctoral advisor. Her dissertation, completed in 1954, concluded that galaxies clumped together, rather than being randomly distributed through the universe, a controversial idea not pursued by others for two decades. Throughout her graduate studies, she encountered discouraging sexism; in one incident she was not allowed to meet with her advisor in his office, because women were not allowed in that area of the Catholic university.

Career 
For the next eleven years, Rubin held various academic positions. She served for a year as an Instructor of Mathematics and Physics at Montgomery College. From 1955 to 1965 she worked at Georgetown University as a research associate astronomer, lecturer (1959–1962), and finally, assistant professor of astronomy (1962–1965). She joined the Carnegie Institution of Washington (later called Carnegie Institute of Science) in 1965 as a staff member in the Department of Terrestrial Magnetism. There she met her long-time collaborator, instrument-maker Kent Ford. Because she had young children, she did much of her work from home.

In 1963, Rubin began a year-long collaboration with Geoffrey and Margaret Burbidge, during which she made her first observations of the rotation of galaxies while using the McDonald Observatory's 82-inch telescope. During her work at the Carnegie Institute, Rubin applied to observe at the Palomar Observatory in 1965, despite the fact that the building did not have facilities for women. She created her own women's restroom, sidestepping the lack of facilities available for her. She became the first female astronomer to observe there.

At the Carnegie Institution, Rubin began work related to her controversial thesis regarding galaxy clusters with Ford, making hundreds of observations using Ford's image-tube spectrograph. This image intensifier allowed resolving the spectra of astronomical objects that were previously too dim for spectral analysis. The Rubin–Ford effect, an apparent anisotropy in the expansion of the Universe on the scale of 100 million light years, was discovered through studies of spiral galaxies, particularly the Andromeda Galaxy, chosen for its brightness and proximity to Earth. The idea of peculiar motion on this scale in the universe was a highly controversial proposition, which was first published in journals in 1976. It was dismissed by leading astronomers but ultimately shown to be valid. The effect is now known as large scale streaming. The pair also briefly studied quasars, which had been discovered in 1963 and were a popular topic of research.

Wishing to avoid controversial areas of astronomy, including quasars and galactic motion, Rubin began to study the rotation and outer reaches of galaxies, an interest sparked by her collaboration with the Burbidges. She investigated the rotation curves of spiral galaxies, again beginning with Andromeda, by looking at their outermost material. She observed flat rotation curves: the outermost components of the galaxy were moving as quickly as those close to the center. This was an early indication that spiral galaxies were surrounded by dark matter haloes. She further uncovered the discrepancy between the predicted angular motion of galaxies based on the visible light and the observed motion. Her research showed that spiral galaxies rotate quickly enough that they should fly apart, if the gravity of their constituent stars was all that was holding them together; because they stay intact, a large amount of unseen mass must be holding them together, a conundrum that became known as the galaxy rotation problem.

Rubin's calculations showed that galaxies must contain at least five to ten times as much dark matter as ordinary matter. Rubin's results were confirmed over subsequent decades, and became the first persuasive results supporting the theory of dark matter, initially proposed by Fritz Zwicky in the 1930s. This data was confirmed by radio astronomers, the discovery of the cosmic microwave background, and images of gravitational lensing. Her research also prompted a theory of non-Newtonian gravity on galactic scales, but this theory has not been widely accepted by astrophysicists.

Another area of interest for Rubin was the phenomenon of counter-rotation in galaxies. Her discovery that some gas and stars moved in the opposite direction to the rotation of the rest of the galaxy challenged the prevailing theory that all of the material in a galaxy moved in the same direction, and provided the first evidence for galaxy mergers and the process by which galaxies initially formed.

Rubin's perspective on the history of the work on galaxy movements was presented in a review, "One Hundred Years of Rotating Galaxies," for the Publications of the Astronomical Society of the Pacific in 2000. This was an adaptation of the lecture she gave in 1996 upon receiving the Gold Medal of the Royal Astronomical Society, the second woman to be so honored, 168 years after Caroline Herschel received the Medal in 1828.
In 2002, Discover magazine recognized Rubin as one of the 50 most important women in science. She continued her research and mentorship until her death in 2016.

Legacy 

When Rubin was elected to the National Academy of Science, she became the second woman astronomer in its ranks, after her colleague Margaret Burbidge. Rubin never won the Nobel Prize, though physicists such as Lisa Randall and Emily Levesque have argued that this was an oversight. She was described by Sandra Faber and Neta Bahcall as one of the astronomers who paved the way for other women in the field, as a "guiding light" for those who wished to have families and careers in astronomy. Rebecca Oppenheimer also recalled Rubin's mentorship as important to her early career.

Rubin died on the night of December 25, 2016 of complications associated with dementia. The president of the Carnegie Institution, where she performed the bulk of her work and research, called her a "national treasure."

The Carnegie Institute has created a postdoctoral research fund in Rubin's honor, and the Division on Dynamical Astronomy of the American Astronomical Society has named the Vera Rubin Early Career Prize in her honor.

Rubin was featured in an animated segment of the 13th and final episode of Cosmos: A Spacetime Odyssey. An area on Mars, Vera Rubin Ridge, is named after her and Asteroid 5726 Rubin was named in her honor.

On 6 November 2020, a satellite named after her (ÑuSat 18 or "Vera", COSPAR 2020-079K) was launched into space.

Vera C. Rubin Observatory 
On December 20, 2019, the Large Synoptic Survey Telescope was renamed the National Science Foundation Vera C. Rubin Observatory in recognition of Rubin's contributions to the study of dark matter and her outspoken advocacy for the equal treatment and representation of women in science. The observatory will be on a mountain in Cerro Pachón, Chile and focus on the study of dark matter and dark energy.

In media 
The Verubin Nebula which appears in Season Three of Star Trek: Discovery is named after Rubin.

The Stuff Between the Stars: How Vera Rubin Discovered Most of the Universe is a children's book by Sandra Nickel and Aimee Sicuro.

Awards and honors 
 Member, National Academy of Sciences (elected 1981)
 Member, Pontifical Academy of Sciences
 Member, American Philosophical Society
 Gold Medal of the Royal Astronomical Society (1996)
 Weizmann Women & Science Award (1996)
 Gruber International Cosmology Prize (2002)
 Catherine Wolfe Bruce Gold Medal of the Astronomical Society of the Pacific (2003)
 James Craig Watson Medal of the National Academy of Sciences (2004)
 Richtmyer Memorial Award
 Dickson Prize for Science
 National Medal of Science (1993)
 Adler Planetarium Lifetime Achievement Award
 Jansky Lectureship before the National Radio Astronomy Observatory
 Henry Norris Russell Lectureship, American Astronomical Society (1994)
 Honorary doctorates from Harvard University, Yale University, Smith College, Grinnell College, and Princeton University (2005)

Personal life 

Vera Rubin was married to Robert Joshua Rubin from 1948 until his death in 2008. She had children while undertaking her graduate studies at Cornell, and continued to work on her research while raising their young children. All four of their children earned PhDs in the natural sciences or mathematics: David (born 1950), is a geologist with the U.S. Geological Survey; Judith Young (1952–2014), was an astronomer at the University of Massachusetts; Karl (born 1956), is a mathematician at the University of California at Irvine; and Allan (born 1960), is a geologist at Princeton University. Her children recalled later in life that their mother made a life of science appear desirable and fun, which inspired them to become scientists themselves.

Motivated by her own battle to gain credibility as a woman in a field dominated by male astronomers, Rubin encouraged girls interested in investigating the universe to pursue their dreams. Throughout her life, she faced discouraging comments on her choice of study but persevered, supported by family and colleagues. In addition to encouraging women in astronomy, Rubin was a force for greater recognition of women in the sciences and for scientific literacy.

She and Burbidge advocated together for more women to be elected to the National Academy of Sciences (NAS), selected for review panels, and included in academic searches. She said that despite her struggles with the NAS, she continued to be dissatisfied with the low number of women who are elected each year, and said it was "the saddest part of [her] life".

Rubin was Jewish, and saw no conflict between science and religion. In an interview, she said: "In my own life, my science and my religion are separate. I'm Jewish, and so religion to me is a kind of moral code and a kind of history. I try to do my science in a moral way, and, I believe that, ideally, science should be looked upon as something that helps us understand our role in the universe."

Publications

Books

Articles 
The following are a small selection of articles selected by the scientists and historians of the CWP project (Contributions of 20-th Century Women to Physics), as being representative of her most important writings; Rubin published over 150 scientific papers.

 
 
 
 
 
 
  The abstract of this is also generally available.

References

Further reading

External links 

 
 SciShow about Vera Rubin
 Discover Magazine interview (2002)
 Telling Stories about the Universe (2003 lecture) 
 Neta A. Bahcall, "Vera C. Rubin", Biographical Memoirs of the National Academy of Sciences (2021)

1928 births
2016 deaths
American women astronomers
Jewish women scientists
Jewish astronomers
Dark matter
Cornell University alumni
Georgetown University alumni
Jewish American scientists
Members of the Pontifical Academy of Sciences
Members of the United States National Academy of Sciences
National Medal of Science laureates
Recipients of the Gold Medal of the Royal Astronomical Society
Vassar College alumni
American people of Lithuanian-Jewish descent
American people of Moldovan-Jewish descent
Scientists from Philadelphia
Members of the American Philosophical Society
20th-century American astronomers
21st-century American astronomers
20th-century American women scientists
21st-century American women scientists
Cosmologists
American astrophysicists
American women physicists
Women astronomers
Women astrophysicists
Women planetary scientists